In mathematics, a transcendental number is a number that is not algebraic—that is, not the root of a non-zero polynomial of finite degree with rational coefficients.

Though only a few classes of transcendental numbers are known—partly because it can be extremely difficult to show that a given number is transcendental—transcendental numbers are not rare. Indeed, almost all real and complex numbers are transcendental, since the algebraic numbers comprise a countable set, while the set of real numbers and the set of complex numbers are both uncountable sets, and therefore larger than any countable set. All transcendental real numbers (also known as real transcendental numbers or transcendental irrational numbers) are irrational numbers, since all rational numbers are algebraic. The converse is not true: not all irrational numbers are transcendental. Hence, the set of real numbers consists of non-overlapping rational, algebraic non-rational and transcendental real numbers. For example, the square root of 2 is an irrational number, but it is not a transcendental number as it is a root of the polynomial equation . The golden ratio (denoted  or ) is another irrational number that is not transcendental, as it is a root of the polynomial equation . The quality of a number being transcendental is called transcendence.

History
Euler, in the 18th century, was probably the first person to define transcendental numbers in the modern sense.

Joseph Liouville first proved the existence of transcendental numbers in 1844, and in 1851 gave the first decimal examples such as the Liouville constant 

In other words, the th digit of this number is 1 only if  is one of the numbers , etc. Liouville showed that this number belongs to a class of transcendental numbers that can be more closely approximated by rational numbers than can any irrational algebraic number, and this class of numbers are called Liouville numbers, named in his honour. Liouville showed that all Liouville numbers are transcendental.

In 1874, Georg Cantor proved that the algebraic numbers are countable and the real numbers are uncountable.  He also gave a new method for constructing transcendental numbers. Although this was already implied by his proof of the countability of the algebraic numbers, Cantor also published a construction that proves there are as many transcendental numbers as there are real numbers. Cantor's work established the ubiquity of transcendental numbers.

He first proved that  is transcendental if  is a non-zero algebraic number. Then, since  is algebraic (see Euler's identity),  must be transcendental. But since  is algebraic,  therefore must be transcendental. This approach was generalized by Karl Weierstrass to what is now known as the Lindemann–Weierstrass theorem. The transcendence of  allowed the proof of the impossibility of several ancient geometric constructions involving compass and straightedge, including the most famous one, squaring the circle.

The affirmative answer was provided in 1934 by the Gelfond–Schneider theorem. This work was extended by Alan Baker in the 1960s in his work on lower bounds for linear forms in any number of logarithms (of algebraic numbers).

Properties
A transcendental number is a (possibly complex) number that is not the root of any integer polynomial. Every real transcendental number must also be irrational, since a rational number is the root of an integer polynomial of degree one. The set of transcendental numbers is uncountably infinite. Since the polynomials with rational coefficients are countable, and since each such polynomial has a finite number of zeroes, the algebraic numbers must also be countable. However, Cantor's diagonal argument proves that the real numbers (and therefore also the complex numbers) are uncountable. Since the real numbers are the union of algebraic and transcendental numbers, it is impossible for both subsets to be countable. This makes the transcendental numbers uncountable.

No rational number is transcendental and all real transcendental numbers are irrational. The irrational numbers contain all the real transcendental numbers and a subset of the algebraic numbers, including the quadratic irrationals and other forms of algebraic irrationals.

Applying any non-constant single-variable algebraic function to a transcendental argument yields a transcendental value.

However, an algebraic function of several variables may yield an algebraic number when applied to transcendental numbers if these numbers are not algebraically independent. To see this, consider the polynomial . But this is a contradiction, and thus it must be the case that at least one of the coefficients is transcendental.

The non-computable numbers are a strict subset of the transcendental numbers.

All Liouville numbers are transcendental, but not vice versa. Any Liouville number must have unbounded partial quotients in its continued fraction expansion. Using a counting argument one can show that there exist transcendental numbers which have bounded partial quotients and hence are not Liouville numbers.

Kurt Mahler showed in 1953 that  is also not a Liouville number. It is conjectured that all infinite continued fractions with bounded terms that are not eventually periodic are transcendental (eventually periodic continued fractions correspond to quadratic irrationals).

Numbers proven to be transcendental
Numbers proven to be transcendental:

  if  is algebraic and nonzero (by the Lindemann–Weierstrass theorem).
 (by the Lindemann–Weierstrass theorem).
, the Gelfond–Schneider constant (or Hilbert number)
The fixed point of the cosine function (also referred to as the Dottie number ) – the unique real solution to the equation , where  is in radians (by the Lindemann–Weierstrass theorem).
  if  is algebraic and not equal to 0 or 1, for any branch of the logarithm function (by the Lindemann–Weierstrass theorem).
  if  is algebraic and nonzero, for any branch of the Lambert W Function (by the Lindemann–Weierstrass theorem), in particular:  the omega constant
 , the square super-root of any natural number is either an integer or transcendental (by the Gelfond–Schneider theorem)
 0.64341054629..., Cahen's constant.
 The Champernowne constants, the irrational numbers formed by concatenating representations of all positive integers..
 , Chaitin's constant (since it is a non-computable number).
 The so-called Fredholm constants, such as. The name 'Fredholm number' is misplaced: Kempner first proved this number is transcendental, and the note on page 403 states that Fredholm never studied this number.

which also holds by replacing 10 with any algebraic .
 Gauss's constant and the lemniscate constant.
 The aforementioned Liouville constant for any algebraic .
 The Prouhet–Thue–Morse constant..
 The Komornik–Loreti constant.
 Any number for which the digits with respect to some fixed base form a Sturmian word.
 For  
 
where  is the floor function.
 3.300330000000000330033... and its reciprocal 0.30300000303..., two numbers with only two different decimal digits whose nonzero digit positions are given by the Moser–de Bruijn sequence and its double.

Possible transcendental numbers
Numbers which have yet to be proven to be either transcendental or algebraic:
 Most sums, products, powers, etc. of the number  and the number , e.g.
 The Euler–Mascheroni constant : In 2010 M. Ram Murty and N. Saradha found an infinite list of numbers containing  such that all but at most one of them are transcendental.
 Apéry's constant  (which Apéry proved is irrational).
 Catalan's constant, not even proven to be irrational.
 Khinchin's constant, also not proven to be irrational.
 The Riemann zeta function at other odd integers, ... (not proven to be irrational).
 Mills' constant, also not proven to be irrational.
 The Copeland–Erdős constant, formed by concatenating the decimal representations of the prime numbers.
  has not been proven to be irrational.

Conjectures:
 Schanuel's conjecture,
 Four exponentials conjecture.

Sketch of a proof that  is transcendental
The first proof that the base of the natural logarithms, is transcendental dates from 1873. We will now follow the strategy of David Hilbert (1862–1943) who gave a simplification of the original proof of Charles Hermite. The idea is the following:

Assume, for purpose of finding a contradiction, that  is algebraic. Then there exists a finite set of integer coefficients c0, c1, ..., cn satisfying the equation:

Now for a positive integer k, we define the following polynomial:

and multiply both sides of the above equation by

to arrive at the equation:

By splitting respective domains of integration, this equation can be written in the form

whereLemma 1. For an appropriate choice of k,  is a non-zero integer.

Proof. Each term in P is an integer times a sum of factorials, which results from the relation

which is valid for any positive integer j (consider the Gamma function).

It is non-zero because for every a satisfying 0< a ≤ n, the integrand in

is e−x times a sum of terms whose lowest power of x is k+1 after substituting x for x+a in the integral. Then this becomes a sum of integrals of the form

 Where Aj-k is integer.

with k+1 ≤ j, and it is therefore an integer divisible by (k+1)!. After dividing by k!, we get zero modulo (k+1). However, we can write:

and thus

So when dividing each integral in P by k!, the initial one is not divisible by k+1, but all the others are, as long as k+1 is prime and larger than n and |c0|. It follows that  itself is not divisible by the prime k+1 and therefore cannot be zero.Lemma 2.'''  for sufficiently large .

 Proof. Note that

That is, there are constants  such that

So each of those integrals composing  is bounded, the worst case being

It is now possible to bound the sum  as well:

It follows that

finishing the proof of this lemma.

Choosing a value of  satisfying both lemmas leads to a non-zero integer added to a vanishingly small quantity being equal to zero, is an impossibility. It follows that the original assumption, that  can satisfy a polynomial equation with integer coefficients, is also impossible; that is,  is transcendental.

The transcendence of 
A similar strategy, different from Lindemann's original approach, can be used to show that the number  is transcendental.

See also

 Transcendental number theory, the study of questions related to transcendental numbers
 Gelfond–Schneider theorem
 Diophantine approximation
 Periods, a set of numbers (including both transcendental and algebraic numbers) which may be defined by integral equations.

Notes

References

External links

602440|Transcendental number (mathematics)}

  Proof that e is transcendental
  Proof that the Liouville Constant is transcendental
  Proof that e is transcendental (PDF) 
  http://www.mathematik.uni-muenchen.de/~fritsch/pi.pdf 

 
Articles containing proofs